Joseph McDonald Sceroler (born April 9, 1995) is an American professional baseball pitcher in the Cincinnati Reds organization. He has previously played in Major League Baseball (MLB) for the Baltimore Orioles. He made his MLB debut in 2021.

Career

Amateur
Sceroler attended Denham Springs High School in Denham Springs, Louisiana, and Southeastern Louisiana University, where he played college baseball for the Southeastern Louisiana Lions. In 2016, he played collegiate summer baseball for the Hyannis Harbor Hawks of the Cape Cod Baseball League. The Philadelphia Phillies selected Sceroler as a draft-eligible sophomore in the 36th round of the 2016 MLB draft, but he opted not to sign so that he could return to Southeastern Louisiana for his junior year.

Cincinnati Reds
The Cincinnati Reds selected Sceroler in the fifth round, 137th overall, of the 2017 MLB draft, and he signed with the Reds. He made his professional debut with the rookie-level Billings Mustangs in 2017, posting a 3.26 ERA in 12 games. Sceroler opened the 2018 season with the Single-A Dayton Dragons, but missed time due to a strained oblique muscle, ultimately finishing the year with a 4-8 record and 4.97 ERA between Billings and Dayton. In 2019, he pitched for the High-A Daytona Tortugas, logging a 5-4 record and 3.69 ERA with 127 strikeouts in 117.0 innings of work. Sceroler did not play in a game in 2020 due to the cancellation of the minor league season because of the COVID-19 pandemic.

Baltimore Orioles
The Baltimore Orioles selected Sceroler from the Reds in the 2020 Rule 5 draft. He made the Orioles' Opening Day roster. On April 5, 2021, Sceroler made his MLB debut, relieving Paul Fry to face Aaron Judge with the bases loaded in a game against the New York Yankees, whom he struck out on 6 pitches. In his debut he threw 2.2 innings, recording 4 strikeouts. Sceroler struggled to a 14.09 ERA in 5 appearances before being designated for assignment on June 22.

Cincinnati Reds (second stint)
On June 26, 2021, Sceroler was returned to the Cincinnati Reds organization and assigned to the Triple-A Louisville Bats.

Personal life
Two of Sceroler's uncles, Ben McDonald and Brett Laxton, played in Major League Baseball.

See also
Rule 5 draft results

References

External links

Living people
1995 births
People from Denham Springs, Louisiana
Baseball players from Louisiana
Major League Baseball pitchers
Baltimore Orioles players
Southeastern Louisiana Lions baseball players
Hyannis Harbor Hawks players
Billings Mustangs players
Dayton Dragons players
Daytona Tortugas players